Rondel Kelvin Sorrillo (born 24 January 1986) is a Trinidad and Tobago sprinter, who specializes in the 200 meters.  He was the first University of Kentucky athlete to win the men's 200 m title at the NCAA championships, winning it in 2010.

Sorrillo competed in the 200 meters event at the 2008 Olympic Games, but without reaching the final round. He ran a personal best for the 100 m at the 2012 national championships, placing third with a time of 10.03 seconds.  He represented Trinidad and Tobago in both the 100 and 200 metres at the 2012 Summer Olympics.

He was part of the Trinidad and Tobago 4 × 100 m team that won the bronze medal at the 2014 Commonwealth Games.

His personal best time for the 200 metres is 20.16 seconds. He also has a 9.99 second (+1.7) personal best in the 100 meters, achieved in 2016 while finishing second in the Trinidad and Tobago Olympic Trials.  At 30 years, 152 days, he became the third oldest person to achieve a sub-10 second time for the first time; and 6.57 seconds in the 60 meters, achieved in January 2015 in Lexington.

International competitions

1Disqualified in the final

References

External links

Official bio at Kentucky

1986 births
Living people
Trinidad and Tobago male sprinters
Olympic athletes of Trinidad and Tobago
Kentucky Wildcats men's track and field athletes
Athletes (track and field) at the 2008 Summer Olympics
Athletes (track and field) at the 2012 Summer Olympics
Athletes (track and field) at the 2016 Summer Olympics
Athletes (track and field) at the 2014 Commonwealth Games
World Athletics Championships athletes for Trinidad and Tobago
Athletes (track and field) at the 2015 Pan American Games
Commonwealth Games bronze medallists for Trinidad and Tobago
Commonwealth Games medallists in athletics
Pan American Games medalists in athletics (track and field)
Pan American Games bronze medalists for Trinidad and Tobago
Central American and Caribbean Games gold medalists for Trinidad and Tobago
Competitors at the 2010 Central American and Caribbean Games
World Athletics Indoor Championships medalists
Central American and Caribbean Games medalists in athletics
Medalists at the 2015 Pan American Games
Medallists at the 2014 Commonwealth Games